Mária Berzsenyi (born 31 October 1946 in Sármellék, Zala) is a former Hungarian handball goalkeeper, Olympic Games and World Championship bronze medalist.

She has won the bronze medal with the Hungarian national team on the 1975 World Championship, a success she repeated in the following year on the Olympic Games. Four years later she was a member of the Hungarian team which finished fourth in the 1980 Olympic Games. She played in three matches.

References

1946 births
Living people
Hungarian female handball players
Handball players at the 1976 Summer Olympics
Handball players at the 1980 Summer Olympics
Olympic handball players of Hungary
Olympic bronze medalists for Hungary
Olympic medalists in handball
Medalists at the 1976 Summer Olympics